Bexbach is a town in the Saarpfalz district, in Saarland, Germany. It is situated on the river Blies, approximatively 6 km east of Neunkirchen, and 25 km northeast of Saarbrücken. The Saarländisches Bergbaumuseum (Saarland Mining Museum) is located in the town.

Sons and daughters of the town

 Edwin Hügel (1919-1988), politician (FDP), minister of economy, transport and agriculture in Cabinet Zeyer II (1982-1983)
 Gerd Dudenhöffer (born 1949), comedian and author

International relations

Bexbach is twinned with:
 Edenkoben, Germany, since 1936
 Goshen, United States, since 1979
 Pornichet, France, since 1985

References

External links 

http://www.bexbach.de

Saarpfalz-Kreis
Palatinate (region)